Ghulam Qadir Chandio is a Pakistani politician who had been a Member of the Provincial Assembly of Sindh, from May 2013 to May 2018.

Early life and education
He was born on 15 October 1959.

He has a degree of Master of Arts in Political Science and a degree of Bachelors of Arts.

Political career
He was elected to the Provincial Assembly of Sindh as a candidate of Pakistan Peoples Party (PPP) from Constituency PS-27 SHAHEED BANAZIR ABAD-IV in 2013 Pakistani general election.

He was re-elected to Provincial Assembly of Sindh as a candidate of PPP from Constituency PS-39 (Shaheed Benazirabad-III) in 2018 Pakistani general election.

References

Living people
Sindh MPAs 2013–2018
1959 births
Pakistan People's Party MPAs (Sindh)
Sindh MPAs 2018–2023